Tom Hoover ( – October 21, 2022) was an American gasser drag racer.

Driving a DeSoto-powered 1957 Plymouth, he won NHRA's first ever C/Gas Altered (C/GA) national title at Detroit Dragway in 1960. He won no other NHRA gasser titles.

Hoover died on October 21, 2022, at the age of 81.

References

Sources
Davis, Larry. Gasser Wars, North Branch, MN:  Cartech, 2003, pp. 180–6.

External links
 

1940s births
Year of birth missing
2022 deaths
American racing drivers
Dragster drivers